Frederick Norman Wells (23 March 1905 – 18 November 1963) was an  Australian rules footballer who played with Hawthorn in the Victorian Football League (VFL).

Notes

External links 

1905 births
1963 deaths
Australian rules footballers from Victoria (Australia)
Hawthorn Football Club players